An understudy is an actor learning a role in case the main actor is indisposed.

Understudy or The Understudy may also refer to:

Literature
 The Understudy (novel), a 2005 novel by David Nicholls
 The Understudy, a 1975 novel by Elia Kazan
 The Understudy, a 2007 play by Theresa Rebeck

Film
 The Understudy (1922 film), an American film of 1922 directed by William A. Seiter
 The Understudy (1976 film), an Australian television film directed by Eric Luithle
 The Understudy: Graveyard Shift II, a 1988 Canadian horror film directed by Jerry Ciccoritti 
 The Understudy (2008 film), a British comedy directed by David Conolly and Hannah Davis

Television episodes
 "The Understudy" (Inside No. 9)
 "The Understudy" (Seinfeld)
 "Understudy" (Smash)
 "The Understudy" (Upstairs, Downstairs)